Doxifluridine is a second generation nucleoside analog prodrug developed by Roche and used as a cytostatic agent in chemotherapy in several Asian countries including China and South Korea. Doxifluridine is not FDA-approved for use in the USA. It is currently being evaluated in several clinical trials as a stand-alone or combination therapy treatment.

Biology
5-fluorouracil (5-FU), the nucleobase of doxifluridine, is currently an FDA-approved antimetabolite. 5-FU is normally administered intravenously to prevent its degradation by dihydropyrimidine dehydrogenase in the gut wall. Doxifluridine (5´-deoxy-5-fluorouridine) is a fluoropyrimidine derivative of 5-FU, thus a second-generation nucleoside prodrug. Doxifluridine was designed to improve oral bioavailability in order to avoid dihydropyrimidine dehydrogenase degradation in the digestive system.

Within a cell, pyrimidine nucleoside phosphorylase or thymidine phosphorylase can metabolize doxifluridine into 5-FU. It is also a metabolite of capecitabine. High levels of pyrimidine-nucleoside phosphorylase  and thymidine phosphorylase are expressed in esophageal, breast, cervical, pancreatic, and hepatic cancers. Liberation of 5-FU is the active metabolite and leads to inhibition of DNA synthesis and cell death.

Side effects
High thymidine phosphorylase expression is also found in the human intestinal tract, resulting in dose-limiting toxicity (diarrhea) in some individuals.

The most frequent adverse effects for doxifluridine were neurotoxicity and mucositis.

Brand names
Doxifluridine is sold under many brand names:

References

Antineoplastic drugs
Nucleosides
Organofluorides
Fluoropyrimidines